is a name for cheaply produced (often direct to video) Yakuza movies.  The genre often is known for its themes of sex and violence.

Takashi Miike is one director who rose through the world of Gokudō to become an internationally known sensation.

Film genres